FC Neftyanik Bugulma was a Russian football team from Bugulma. It played professionally from 1965 to 1969 and from 1995 to 1997. Their best result was 2nd place in the Zone 5/RSFSR of the Soviet Second League in 1969.

Team name history
 1965–1969, 1993 FC Neftyanik Bugulma
 1994–1996 FC Planeta Bugulma
 1997–2000 FC Neftyanik Bugulma

External links
  Team history at KLISF

Association football clubs established in 1965
Association football clubs disestablished in 2001
Defunct football clubs in Russia
Sport in Tatarstan
1965 establishments in Russia
2001 disestablishments in Russia